The Saint Petersburg Military Engineering-Technical University (Nikolaevsky) (VITU), previously known as the Saint Petersburg Nikolaevsky Engineering Academy, was established in 1810 under Alexander I. The university is situated in the former barracks of the Cavalier-Guard Regiment where the university was founded.

Description
Military Engineering-Technical University is a higher military educational institution preparing officers of engineering and building specialties for all branches of troops and navy. It is located in Saint Petersburg where the university was founded, near Engineers Castle, Summer Garden, Suvorov Museum, Tauride Palace, and Smolny Convent.

Military Engineering-Technical University has six faculties preparing specialists in the following branches: 
 Military construction,
 Military energy resource engineering,
 Naval base construction,
 Sanitary engineering,
 Mechanization of construction,
 Special for civil.

The university trains experts in the field of construction of buildings and special structures, engineering and technical systems and power industry. It has an experimental base for testing various thermal-mechanical and power equipment, structures and construction materials, and carries out research and development activities. It provides military university trained officers for all the Engineering Troops of Russia, a counterpart of the U.S. Army Corps of Engineers.

History 

This is one of Saint Petersburg's eldest Higher Military engineering schools, its history (as Higher learning institution) beginning in 1810. The Saint Petersburg Military Engineering-Technical University was founded as the Saint Petersburg military engineering School in 1810 on the base of the military school of engineering conductors (engineering of non-commissioned officers), after addition of officers classes and application of five-year term of teaching. In 1819 was renamed as the Main military engineering School. How Stephen Timoshenko wrote in a book "Engineering Education in Russia" the system of Higher learning institution of five-year Education of Main military engineering school was used later on the example of Institute of railway Engineers by all Russia and develops until now. This engineering school was alma mater of graduate for Fyodor Dostoyevsky. In 1855, officers classes of the Nikolaevsky Engineering School was reformed as the Nikolaevsky Engineering Academy.

After 1917, numerous transformations of Nikolaevsky Engineering Academy and Engineering school were undertaken (but Higher learning institution survived). It was renamed as the Military-Engineering Academy, and then as Military-Technical Academy. But in 1932 followed the unsuccessful attempt of moving the Engineering Faculty to Moscow; it was completed later as the Sea Faculty returned to Leningrad in 1939 (As a result, from the base Saint Petersburg Engineering Higher learning institution was separated a new Moscow military Engineering-administrative academy). Only Nikolay Gerasimovich Kuznetsov could counteract Joseph Stalin`s policy against the Nikolaevsky Engineering Academy and school in 1939. He ordered that the university be revived, and that the Marine Engineering faculty be returned from Moscow. The attempts at bureaucratic movings (or Stalin's unfavorable attitude, 1932–1939) of the Saint Petersburg High School of Military Engineers can be examined in the historical context of the "Military Case" and Great Purge, on the eve of war against fascism. Also, Stalin's dislike of Fyodor Dostoyevsky was the reason of the unfavorable attitude against a university (because Stalin did not understand Dostoyevsky) .

There were destructive consequences of some degradation for the pedagogical and scientific forces of Saint Petersburg High School of Military Engineers, but it was successfully corrected only due to the donor help of Petersburg Polytechnical Institute. Nikolaevsky Engineering Academy was formally and legally reborn in 1939 as the Higher Naval Engineering Construction School on the base of the Leningrad Industrial Construction Engineers Institute (separate part of Saint Petersburg Polytechnical University), and enlarged with the Sea Engineering Faculty of the Moscow Military Academy. Higher Naval Engineering Construction School was renamed the Higher Naval Engineering Technical School. Leonid Kantorovich became the professor of Military Engineering-Technical University, previously known as the Nikolaevsky Engineering Academy, when it was revived on the site of part of the Polytechnical Institute.

Also, the academician Boris Galerkin took a general's uniform in 1939, as the head of VITU's structural mechanics department became a lieutenant general. In September 1960, VITU university was called the Order of the Red Banner Higher Military Engineering School and became part of the construction troops. In 1974, the university was named after A.N. Komarovsky. In 1993, the university was reformed as the Military Engineering-Technical Institute, which received its present-day name in 1997, after as did merger the Pushkin Higher Military Engineering Construction School.

The Second World War
Military Engineering-Technical University directly took part in World War II. The graduating students of the university fought heroically at all fronts of that war. They showed spiritual force and quality of engineering competence. The forts and numerous fortifications buildings was established by the graduating students of university, all of it played a vital part in defending (for example Brest Fortress). So unique Krasnaya Gorka fort was constructed by the graduating students of VITU at the beginning of the 20th century with the installation of 12-inch guns in concrete casemates. The system of forts played a key part in the Siege of Leningrad. The VITU's graduating students by the commanders of Krasnaya Gorka fort did to finally stopped the offensive of fascists already in 1941. During the Siege of Leningrad, Boris Galerkin was the head of the city engineering defence department experts group. Also, he joined the military engineering commission of the Academy of Sciences. Hard non-stop work was undermining his health. Leonid Kantorovich was the professor of the VITU of the Navy, and there he was in charge of safety on the Road of Life; for his feat and courage he was awarded the Order of the Patriotic War.

Traditions of Saint Petersburg High School of Military Engineers 

Military Engineering-Technical University prolongs, saves and develops the scientific and pedagogical traditions of Saint Petersburg High (higher learning institution) School of Military Engineers, the Nikolaevsky Engineering Academy and Nikolaevsky Engineering School, in the place of its own historical motherland.

Alumni and faculty

In total, the University prepared more than 45,000 military engineers. Among its alumni and faculty are:
 Leonid Artamonov, a Russian general, geographer and traveler, military adviser of Menelik II, as one of Russian officers of volunteers was attached to the forces of Ras Tessema (wrote: «Through Ethiopia to the White Nile»)
 Alexander Vegener (Russian: Вегенер, Александр Николаевич), a Russian military pilot, engineer, aircraft designer, chief of the main air field, first chief of Zhukovsky Air Force Engineering Academy
 Konstantin Velichko (Russian: Величко, Константин Иванович),  — a Russian/Soviet general military engineer, professor of fortification and author of numerous fortifications projects, for example the Red hill fort
 Boris Galerkin, a Russian/Soviet mathematician and engineer
 Dmitry Grigorovich, a Russian writer
 Fyodor Dostoyevsky, a Russian writer and essayist
 Alexander Dutov, a lieutenant general and one of the leaders of the Cossack counterrevolution
 Leonid Kapitsa (Russian: Капица, Леонид Петрович), was father for nobel laureate Pyotr Kapitsa, a Russian general military engineer, oversaw Kronstadt's forts construction
 Konstantin von Kaufman, the first Governor-General of Russian Turkestan
 Amanullah Jahanbani, an Iranian senior general and senator. 
 Leonid Kantorovich, a winner of the Nobel Prize in Economics, a Russian mathematician and economist, known for his theory and development of techniques for the optimal allocation of resources
 Roman Kondratenko, a Russian general famous for his steadfast defense of Port Arthur (now Lüshunkou) during the Russo-Japanese War
 Vladimir Korguzalov (Russian: Коргузалов, Владимир Леонидович), a Hero of the Soviet Union chief of engineers, major of Guard troops of 47th army of Voronezh front
 Alexander Kvist (Russian: Квист, Александр Ильич), a Russian military engineer of fortification
 César Cui, an army officer and a teacher of fortifications, as well as a composer and music critic, known as a member of The Five, the group of Russian composers under the leadership of Mily Balakirev dedicated to the production of a specifically Russian type of music
 Dmitri Dmitrievich Maksutov (1896–1964), a Russian/Soviet optical engineer and amateur astronomer. He is best known as the inventor of the Maksutov telescope.
 Alexander Lukomsky, a Russian military commander, General Staff, Lieutenant-General who fought for the Imperial Russian Army during the First World War and was one of the organizers of the Volunteer army during the Russian Civil War.
 Vladimir May-Mayevsky, a Russian army general and one of the leaders of the counterrevolutionary White movement during the Russian Civil War
 Dmitri Mendeleev, a Russian chemist and inventor, credited as the creator of the periodic table of elements
 Boris Mozhaev (Russian: Можаев, Борис Андреевич), a Russian writer and friend Aleksandr Solzhenitsyn
 Grand Duke Nicholas Nikolaevich of Russia (1856–1929)
 Mikhail Vasilievich Ostrogradsky, a Russian mathematician, mechanician and physicist who is considered to be a disciple of Leonhard Euler and one of the leading mathematicians of Imperial Russia
 Nicholas Petin (Russian: Петин, Николай Николаевич), a Red Army general, chief of engineers of Red Army
 Alexei Polivanov, a Russian military figure
 Ivan Sechenov, a Russian physiologist, named by Ivan Pavlov as "The Father of Russian physiology", who authored Reflexes of the Brain, introducing electrophysiology and neurophysiology into laboratories and teaching of medicine
 Eduard Totleben, a military engineer and Imperial Russian Army general who was in charge of fortification and sapping work during a number of important Russian military campaigns
 Baron Peter von Uslar a Russian general, engineer and linguist of German descent, known for his research of languages and ethnography of peoples of Caucasus.
 Pavel Yablochkov, a Russian electrical engineer, the inventor of the Yablochkov candle (a type of electric carbon arc lamp) and a businessman
 Shuliachenko Aleksey Romanovich (Russian: Шуляченко, Алексей Романович), a Russian engineer, general and chemist, known as the "grandfather of the Russian Cement"
 Golovin Kharlampiy Sergeevich (Russian: Головин, Харлампий Сергеевич), a rector of Saint Petersburg State Institute of Technology
 Nestor Buinitsky (Russian: Буйницкий, Нестор Алоизиевич), a Russian engineer, professor of fortification and lieutenant general.

Sources

External links
 Anna Dostoyevskaya 
 
 
 
 
 
 
 
 
 
 
 
 
 

 
Military academies of Russia
Universities in Saint Petersburg
Naval academies
Educational institutions established in 1810
Engineering universities and colleges in Russia
Military high schools
Public universities and colleges in Russia
Science and technology in Russia
1810 establishments in the Russian Empire